14th Street Viaduct may refer to:

In Hudson County, New Jersey
An extension of 14th Street (Hoboken)
14th Street Viaduct (Jersey City, New Jersey)

In other locations
14th Street Viaduct (Denver, Colorado), on the National Register of Historic Places listings in downtown Denver